The 2007 Australian Club Championships (ACC) brought together the best men's and women's basketball teams from the Waratah League, South East Australian Basketball League (SEABL), Queensland Australian Basketball League (QABL), Central Australian Basketball League (CABL) and Big V competitions for their shot at national glory, with the event held at the Melbourne Sports and Aquatic Centre.

By the tournament's conclusion, the Cairns Marlins were crowned as the best male basketball club in Australia and the Townsville Flames were crowned women's champions.

Tournament overview
The Cairns Marlins defeated the Dandenong Rangers 110–98 in the men's Grand Final. Nothing could split the sides in the first half but the Rangers, who finished runners-up for the second year in a row, could not contain the offensive strength of the Marlins, who had five players score 16 points or more. Cairns Taipans National Basketball League stars Aaron Grabau and Gary Boodnikoff netted 24 points and 23 points respectively to lead the Marlins with Grabau going on to be named Grand Final MVP. Future Australian Boomer Nathan Jawai also chipped in with a 21-point, 13-rebound double-double and proved to be the difference in the decisive third quarter.

In the women's final, the Townsville Flames defeated the Hume City Broncos, 92–49. Australian Opal Rohanee Cox was outstanding for Townsville, netting a game-high 30 points while Townsville Fire Women's National Basketball League guard Celeste Heilbronn added 21 points and 9 rebounds in support. The Broncos were missing Opal Sharin Milner and Under 21 World Championship silver medalist Elyse Penaluna through injury and couldn't match the offensive power of the Flames.

Participants
To qualify for the event, teams had to be crowned Champion of their respective Leagues. There were also a number of wildcard entries.

League champions

Wildcards

Results

Quarter-finals – men

Quarter-finals – women

Semi-finals – men

Semi-finals – women

Grand Finals

All-Star Five

Men

Women

See also
Australian Basketball Association

References

External links
Basketball Australia 2007 Annual Report
The Road to the ABA National Finals

Australian Basketball Association
Club